Mother of Eden is a social science fiction novel by British author Chris Beckett, first published in the United Kingdom in June 2015 and later in the United States in January 2016. It is the sequel to the novel Dark Eden and follows events of the first book several generations later.

Reviews

External links 
Mother of Eden

2015 British novels
British science fiction novels
2015 science fiction novels
Atlantic Books books